The General debate of the seventy-fourth session of the United Nations General Assembly (UNGA) opened on 24 September and ran until 30 September 2019. Leaders from a number of member states addressed the UNGA.

Organisation and subjects
The order of speakers is given first to member states, then observer states and supranational bodies. Any other observers entities will have a chance to speak at the end of the debate, if they so choose. Speakers will be put on the list in the order of their request, with special consideration for ministers and other government officials of similar or higher rank. According to the rules in place for the General Debate, the statements should be in of the United Nations official languages of Arabic, Chinese, English, French, Russian or Spanish, and will be translated by the United Nations translators. Each speaker is requested to provide 20 advance copies of their statements to the conference officers to facilitate translation and to be presented at the podium. The theme for this year's debate was chosen by President Tijjani Muhammad-Bande as: "Galvanizing multilateral efforts for poverty eradication, quality education, climate action and inclusion".

Speaking schedule
Since 1955, Brazil and the United States are the first and second countries to speak. Other countries follow according to a speaking schedule issued by the Secretariat.

The list of speakers is provided by both the daily UN Journal, while changes in order are also reflected by the UNGA General Debate website.

24 September

Morning session
  - Secretary-General António Guterres (Report of the UN Secretary-General)
  - 74th Session of the United Nations General Assembly - President Tijjani Muhammad-Bande (Opening statement)
  - President Jair Bolsonaro
  - President Donald J. Trump
  - President Abdel Fattah el-Sisi
  - President Recep Tayyip Erdoğan
  - President Muhammadu Buhari
  - President Ibrahim Mohamed Solih
  - Emir Tamim bin Hamad Al Thani
  - President Ueli Maurer
  - President Kolinda Grabar-Kitarović
  - President Evo Morales
  - King Abdullah II bin Al-Hussein
  - President Moon Jae-in
  - President Roch Marc Christian Kaboré
  - President Emmanuel Macron (Scheduled)
  - President Sebastián Piñera
  - President Emmanuel Macron
  - Chairman of the Presidency Željko Komšić

Evening session
  - President João Lourenço
  - President Marcelo Rebelo de Sousa
  - President Paul Kagame
  - President Sauli Niinistö
  - Prince Albert II
  - President Mahamadou Issoufou
  - King Willem-Alexander
  - President Mauricio Macri
  - President Egils Levits
  - President Zuzana Čaputová
  - President Kassym-Jomart Tokayev
  - President Andrzej Duda
  - President Hilda Heine (Scheduled)
  - Regent Alois von und zu Liechtenstein
  - President Martín Vizcarra
  - President Macky Sall
  - Prime Minister Giuseppe Conte
  - Prime Minister Pedro Sánchez
  - Prime Minister Jacinda Ardern
  - Prime Minister Shinzo Abe
  - Prime Minister Boris Johnson
  - Prime Minister Saadeddine Othmani

Right of Reply
 Member states have the option to reply to comments on the day (or even to the days prior), but are limited to 10 minutes for the first response and five minutes for the second response. All speeches are made from the floor, as opposed to the podium for the General Debate.

25 September

Morning session
  - President Volodymyr Zelensky
  - President Klaus Iohannis
  - President Barham Salih
  - King Mswati III (Scheduled)
  - President George Weah
  - President Hassan Rouhani (Scheduled)
  - President Michel Aoun
  - King Mswati III
  - President Hassan Rouhani
  - President Tommy Remengesau Jr.
  - President Salome Zourabichvili
  - President Faustin-Archange Touadera
  - President Iván Duque Márquez
  - President Danny Faure
  - President Mohamed Ould Ghazouani
  - President Kersti Kaljulaid
  - President Alpha Condé
  - President Edgar Lungu
  - President Idriss Déby
  - President Juan Orlando Hernández
  - Prime Minister Scott Morrison
  - Prime Minister Frank Bainimarama

Evening session
  - President Lenín Moreno
  - President Jimmy Morales
  - President Uhuru Kenyatta
  - President Hage Geingob
  - President Laurentino Cortizo
  - President Carlos Alvarado Quesada
  - Chairman of the Presidential Council Fayez al-Sarraj
  - President Nana Akufo-Addo
  - President Gitanas Nausėda
  - President Michael D. Higgins
  - President Ibrahim Boubacar Keita
  - President Taneti Mamau
  - President Emmerson Mnangagwa
  - Prime Minister Jaber Al-Mubarak Al-Hamad Al-Sabah
  - Prime Minister Nikol Pashinyan
  - Prime Minister Andrej Babiš
  - Prime Minister Xavier Espot Zamora
  - Foreign Minister Heiko Maas

26 September

Morning session
  - King Tupou VI
  - President Nicos Anastasiades
  - President Sahle-Work Zewde (Scheduled)
  - President Aleksandar Vučić
  - President Rumen Radev
  - President Félix Tshisekedi (Scheduled)
  - President Julius Maada Bio
  - President Aleksandar Vučić (Scheduled)
  - President Félix Tshisekedi
  - President Nayib Bukele (Scheduled)
  - President Igor Dodon
  - President Julius Maada Bio (Scheduled)
  - Vice-President Daniel Kablan Duncan
  - President Mohamed Abdullahi Mohamed (Scheduled)
  - President Mahmoud Abbas
  - President Igor Dodon (Scheduled)
  - President Sahle-Work Zewde
  - President Mahmoud Abbas (Scheduled)
  - President of the European Council Donald Tusk
  - President Mohamed Abdullahi Mohamed
  - Vice-President Ashwin Adhin (Scheduled)
  - President Nayib Bukele
  - Vice-President Daniel Kablan Duncan (Scheduled)
  - Vice-President Ashwin Adhin
  - Vice-President Isatou Touray (Scheduled)
  - Prime Minister Charles Michel
  - Prime Minister Xavier Bettel

Evening session
  - President Milo Đukanović
  - President Evaristo Carvalho
  - President Azali Assoumani
  - President Lionel Aingimea
  - President David Panuelo
  - President Peter Mutharika
  - President Charles Savarin
  - President Ismaïl Omar Guelleh
  - First Vice-President Taban Deng Gai
  - Vice-President Isatou Touray
  - Prime Minister Joseph Muscat (Scheduled)
  - Prime Minister Zoran Zaev
  - Foreign Minister Israel Katz
  (Scheduled)
  - Foreign Minister Péter Szijjártó
  - Foreign Minister Alexander Schallenberg
  - Foreign Minister Ibrahim Abdulaziz Al-Assaf
  - Foreign Minister Vladimir Makei
  - Foreign Minister Jeppe Kofod
  - Prime Minister Joseph Muscat
  (Scheduled)
  - Foreign Minister Lejeune Mbella Mbella
  - Foreign Minister Miguel Vargas
  - Foreign Minister Alain Claude Bilie By Nze

27 September

Morning session
  - President Barlen Vyapoory
  - Vice-President Jusuf Kalla
  - Prime Minister Tom Thabane
  - Prime Minister Narendra Modi
  - Prime Minister Erna Solberg (Scheduled)
  - Prime Minister Lee Hsien Loong
  - Prime Minister Imran Khan (Scheduled)
  - Prime Minister Marjan Šarec
  - Prime Minister Imran Khan
  - Prime Minister Andrew Holness (Scheduled)
  - Prime Minister Kyriakos Mitsotakis
  - Prime Minister Marjan Šarec (Scheduled)
  - Prime Minister Andrew Holness
  - Prime Minister Mia Mottley (Scheduled)
  - Prime Minister Kokhir Rasulzoda
  - Prime Minister Edi Rama (Scheduled)
  - Prime Minister Kyriakos Mitsotakis (Scheduled)
  - Prime Minister Erna Solberg
  - Prime Minister Mia Mottley
  - Prime Minister Edi Rama
  - Prime Minister Hubert Minnis
  - Prime Minister Timothy Harris
  - State Councilor and Foreign Minister Wang Yi
  - Foreign Minister Sergey Lavrov
  - Foreign Minister Sabri Boukadoum
  - Foreign Minister Jeremiah Manele
  - Foreign Minister Khemaies Jhinaoui

Evening session
  - Former Vice-President (Disputed) Delcy Rodríguez
  - Prime Minister Ulisses Correia e Silva
  - Prime Minister Mahathir Mohamad
  - Prime Minister Allen Chastanet
  - Prime Minister Tuilaepa Aiono Sailele Malielegaoi
  - Prime Minister Charlot Salwai
  - Prime Minister Sheikh Hasina
  - Prime Minister Gaston Browne
  - Prime Minister Keith Rowley
  - Prime Minister Ralph Gonsalves
  - Prime Minister Abdalla Hamdok
  - Foreign Minister Antonio Rivas Palacios
  - Foreign Minister Guðlaugur Þór Þórðarson
  - Foreign Minister Pradeep Kumar Gyawali
  - Foreign Minister Palamagamba Kabudi
  - Foreign Minister Soroi Eoe
  - Foreign Minister Simeón Oyono Esono Angüe

28 September

Morning session
  - Prime Minister Lotay Tshering
  - Prime Minister Ruhakana Rugunda
  - Prime Minister Christian Ntsay
  - Secretary of State Pietro Parolin
  - Deputy Prime Minister Phạm Bình Minh
  - Deputy Prime Minister Prak Sokhonn
  - Deputy Prime Minister Walid Muallem
  - Deputy Prime Minister Minute Tapuo
  - Foreign Minister Chingiz Aidarbekov
  - Foreign Minister Bruno Rodríguez Parrilla
  - Foreign Secretary Nicola Renzi
  - Foreign Minister Ann Linde
  - Foreign Minister Marcelo Ebrard
  - Foreign Minister Unity Dow
  - Foreign Minister Naledi Pandor
  - Foreign Minister Peter David
  - Foreign Minister John Silk
  - Foreign Minister Suzi Barbosa
  - Foreign Minister Khalid bin Ahmed Al Khalifa

Evening session
  - Foreign Minister Abdullah bin Zayed Al Nahyan
  - Minister Responsible for Foreign Affairs Yusuf bin Alawi bin Abdullah
  - Vice-President Raşit Meredow
  - Foreign Minister Saleumxay Kommasith
  - Foreign Minister Wilfred Elrington
  - Foreign Secretary Teodoro Locsin Jr.
  - Foreign Minister Elmar Mammadyarov
  - Minister of the State Counsellor's Office Kyaw Tint Swe
  - Foreign Minister Damdin Tsogtbaatar
  - Foreign Minister José Condungua Pacheco
  - Foreign Minister Karen Cummings
  - Foreign Minister Denis Moncada
  - Foreign Minister Mohammed Abdullah Al-Hadhrami
  - Foreign Minister Bocchit Edmond
  - Foreign Minister Jean-Claude Gakosso

30 September

Morning session
  - Foreign Minister Osman Saleh Mohammed
  (Scheduled)
  - Foreign Minister Ezechiel Nibigira
  - Second Foreign Minister Erywan Yusof
  (Scheduled)
  - Foreign Minister Rodolfo Nin Novoa
  - Foreign Minister Don Pramudwinai
  (Scheduled)
  (Scheduled) 
  - Foreign Minister Dionísio Babo
  - Permamnent Representative Kim Song
  - National Security Advisor Hamdullah Mohib
  (Scheduled) 
  - Permanent Representative Kokou Kpayedo
  (Scheduled) 
  - Permanent Representative Marc-André Blanchard
  - Permanent Representative Jean-Claude Félix do Rego
  - Foreign Secretary Ravinatha Aryasinha

Notes

References

2019 in international relations
2019 in New York City
General debates of the United Nations General Assembly
September 2019 events in the United States